The 2021 Wakefield Metropolitan Borough Council election took take place during 2021 to elect members of Wakefield Metropolitan District Council in England. The election was held on the same day as other local elections. The election was originally due to take place in May 2020, but was postponed due to the COVID-19 pandemic.

Results

Ackworth, North Elmsall and Upton 
The incumbent Labour councillor Martyn Ward stood down, with the Conservative's Raymond Massey winning the seat.

Airedale and Ferry Fryston 
Incumbent Les Shaw won re-election and Jackie Ferguson won her seat from independent Alex Kear who was expelled from the council after a sexual offense conviction.

Altofts and Whitwood 
Former Mayor of Normanton Josie Farrah won the ward, holding it after former council leader Peter Box CBE's resignation.

Castleford Central and Glasshoughton 
Incumbent Richard Forster won re-election.

Crofton, Ryhill and Walton 
Paul Stockhill beat incumbent councillor Faith Heptinstall  by 79 votes.

Featherstone 
Incumbent Maureen Tennant-King won re-election.

Hemsworth 
Incumbent Pauline Kitching won re-election.

Horbury and South Ossett 
Incumbent Darren Byford won re-election.

Knottingley 
Adele Hayes won the seat from incumbent Graham Stokes who stood down.

Normanton 
Labour's Julie Medford held the seat after the death of the former councillor Alan Wassell.

Ossett 
Incumbent councillor Lynn Masterman (Labour) lost her seat to Conservative Tony Homewood, election agent to Imran Ahmad Khan in the 2019 general election.

Pontefract North 
Incumbent councillor Lorna Malkin (Labour) won re-election for her second term, first being elected in a 2015 by-election.

Pontefract South

South Elmsall and South Kirkby

Stanley and Outwood East

Wakefield East

Wakefield North

Wakefield Rural

Wakefield South

Wakefield West

Wrenthorpe and Outwood West

References 

Wakefield Metropolitan District Council election
2021
2020s in West Yorkshire